Summit Township is a township in Marion County, Kansas, United States.  As of the 2010 census, the township population was 80.

Geography

Communities
The township contains the following settlements:
 Ghost town of Watchorn.  It was a former oil boom community during the 1910s and 1920s.  It is located at the corner of Timber Rd and 60th St.

Cemeteries
The township contains the following cemeteries:
 Summit Township Cemetery ( United Brethren Cemetery), located in Section 23 T22S R4E.  The church was closed and demolished in the 2010s.
 Whitewater Center Cemetery (a.k.a. Stone Church Cemetery), located in Section 28 T22S R4E.  The church is across the road.

Gallery

References

Further reading

External links
 Marion County website
 City-Data.com
 Marion County maps: Current, Historic, KDOT

Townships in Marion County, Kansas
Townships in Kansas